Charles Geoffrey Nason Stanley was Dean of Lismore from 1934 until 1960.

He was born on 10 November 1884 and educated at Trinity College, Dublin. He was ordained in 1908 and began his ecclesiastical career with curacies at Drumcannon and Cappoquin. He held incumbencies in Kilrossanty and Lismore.
His son was killed during World War II.

References

1884 births
Alumni of Trinity College Dublin
Deans of Lismore
1977 deaths